The 2006 NAIA Football Championship Series concluded on December 16, 2006, with the championship game played at Jim Carroll Stadium in Savannah, Tennessee.  In a battle between two unbeaten USF Cougar teams, the game was won by the Sioux Falls Cougars over the Saint Francis Cougars by a score of 23–19.

Tournament bracket

  ** denotes double OT.

References

NAIA Football National Championship
Sioux Falls Cougars football games
Saint Francis Cougars football
December 2006 sports events in the United States
NAIA football